The Melchett Award is an honour awarded by the Energy Institute for outstanding contributions to the science of fuel and energy.

It was created by and named for Alfred Moritz Mond, 1st Baron Melchett, the 20th century businessman and philanthropist.

Winners
Source:

1930: Kurt Rummell
1931: W. A. Bone
1932: Charles M. Schwab
1933: John Cadman
1934: Friedrich Bergius
1935: Harry R. Ricardo
1936: Franz Fischer
1937: Morris W. Travers
1938: R.V. Wheeler
1939: H.A. Humphrey
1940: Étienne Audibert
1941: Clarence A. Seyler
1942: Arno C. Fieldner
1943: E S Grumel
1944: J.G. King
1945: C H Lander
1946: Sir James Chadwick
1947: Kenneth Gordon
1949: Sir Frank Whittle
1950: R.J. Sarjan
1951: F.H. Garner
1952: D.T.A. Townend
1953: H. Hartley
1954: H.H. Storch
1955: A. Parker
1956: Sir Alfred Egerton
1957: Sir Christopher Hinton
1959: P.O. Rosin
1960: H.C. Hottel
1961: Sir Harold Hartley (award to MacFarlane): MacFarlane Memorial Lecture
1962: H.E. Crossley
1963: HRH Prince Philip, Duke of Edinburgh
1964: Homi Jehangir Bhabha
1965: F.J. Dent
1966: Sir Owen Saunders
1967: Sir Charles Cawley
1968: A. Ignatieff
1969: William T. Reid
1970: T E Allibone
1971: Lord Rothschild
1972: F T Bacon
1974: Sir Frederick Warner
1975: Sir John Hill, UKAEA
1976: T G Callcott
1977: J H Chesters
1978: G. Brunner
1979: A.W. Pearce
1980: Sir William Hawthorne
1981: J.H. Dunster
1982: J.A. Gray
1985: J.M. Beer
1986: N. Franklin
1987: Sir George Porter
1988: Frank Fitzgerald
1989: Neville Chamberlain
1990: David Lindley
1991: R.N. Hodge
1992: H.L. Beckers
1993: Robert Evans
1994: S. William Gouse, Jnr
1995: John Chesshire
1996: Sir Crispin Tickell
1997: I. Boustead
1998: Brenda Boardman
1999: Ian Fells
2000: Walt Patterson
2001: Lord Browne of Madingley
2002: Mary Archer
2003: Sir John Parker
2004: Sir Roy Gardner
2005: Vincent de Rivaz 
2008: Andrew Warren
2010: James Skea
2011: Allan Jones
2013: David MacKay
2014: Lord Oxburgh
2016: David King
2017: Fatih Birol

See also

 List of chemistry awards

References

Chemistry awards